Margaret Clare Sharpe is a linguist of Australian Aboriginal languages, specializing in Yugambeh-Bundjalung languages, with particular regard to Yugambir, She has also done important salvage fieldwork on the Northern Territory Alawa language.

Career
Sharpe completed her doctoral dissertation on the language of the Alawa people at the University of Queensland in 1965. After a further stint of fieldwork between June 1966 and May 1968, this was updated and issued as a monograph under the imprint of the Australian Institute of Aboriginal Studies in 1972. In the meantime she worked with one of the last speakers of Yugambir, Joe Culham, then in his eighties, and managed to write up the results in a 53-page analysis published shortly after his death in 1968.

As part of her work on Alawa, she translated both Alawa-language stories and kriol versions of the same given by her informant Barnabas Roberts concerning violent encounters between white settlers and the Alawa, and, according to one reviewer, their juxtaposition underlined that Aboriginal story-telling in their English dialects can be at times as, if not more, revealing as what is recorded of an event in their mother tongue.

Sharpe went on to do extensive work as lecturer at the Department of Aboriginal and Multicultural Studies of the University of New England, on the Yugambeh-Baandjalung dialect chain. She has also been active in teaching indigenous groups about the disappearing languages their forefathers spoke.

Sharpe has written three novels, one of which, A Family Divided, deals with interracial conflict and friendship.

Sharpe speaks a version of Bundjalung, "though not terribly fluently" and has recorded talk in conversations with the Yugambeh language instructor Shaun Davies. She remains an adjunct lecturer, and is now returning to her original interest in science by completing a PhD in astrophysics.

Honours
In 2017, Sharpe was designated a Kaialgumm, "champion in the fight", by the Yugambeh Museum in recognition of her decades-long scholarship and teaching in documenting, and helping to revive, the Yugambeh language

Notes

Citations

Sources

Linguists from Australia
Women linguists
Living people

Year of birth missing (living people)